Robert Brucciani (born 1968) is a Roman Catholic priest who is currently serving as the District Superior of Great Britain & Scandinavia for the traditionalist Society of Saint Pius X.

Career 
In 1998, Robert Brucciani entered the Seminary of St. Curé d'Ars, Flavigny, France. In 2004, after his years of study, Brucciani was ordained a priest at the Seminary of St. Pius X in Ecône, Switzerland. After his ordination, he spent time at St. Michael's School, Burghclere. When he finished his work at St. Michael's School, he took up a post of prior of the Priory of the Most Holy Trinity in Palayamkottai, India for eight years.

In 2015, Father Brucciani was appointed as District Superior of Great Britain & Scandinavia.

In 2017, Father Brucciani signed the petition to Pope Francis called Correctio filialis de haeresibus propagatis regarding heresies they believed to be contained within Amoris laetitia, a post-synodal apostolic exhortation written by Pope Francis. They have not received a response.

References

External links 

Living people
1968 births
People from Leicester
British traditionalist Catholics
21st-century British Roman Catholic priests
Members of the Society of Saint Pius X